Church of Simon the Zealot, is an Anglican church in Shiraz, Iran. It is located on Zand Avenue in Shiraz, next to Shiraz Christian Mission Hospital.

History 

Church Missionary Society (CMS) was active in Persia from 1869, when the Revd. Robert Bruce established a mission station in New Julfa.  In 1938, the Church of St. Luke was consecrated in Shiraz by Revd. Ralph Norman Sharp. It is currently one of four active Anglican churches in Iran, the others are St. Paul Church in Tehran, St. Luke Church in Isfahan and St. Paul Church in New Julfa.

See also
Christianity in Iran
Anglican Diocese of Iran

References 

Buildings and structures in Shiraz
Churches in Iran
Anglicanism in Iran